Red Hot + Rio is a compilation album produced by Béco Dranoff and Paul Heck as part of the Red Hot AIDS Benefit Series intended to promote AIDS awareness. This installment is a contemporary tribute to the bossa nova sound, especially the music of Antonio Carlos Jobim. This release has proven to be one of the Red Hot series' more successful projects, generating hundreds of thousands of dollars for AIDS charities around the world.

Brazilian recording artists including Jobim, Astrud Gilberto and Gilberto Gil are among the contributors to the project.  Along with them, many contemporary pop music performers are featured on this release, including Incognito, David Byrne, Sting and PM Dawn.

Its success made it the 2nd most celebrated entry in the Red Hot Series. The album was sent out to music and lifestyle retail locations (3–5,000 copies) across the country that gave it widespread exposure, including shops such as Urban Outfitters and The Gap as well as upscale shops like Wilkes-Bashford and Louis Boston. Its release coincided with a renewed interest in tourism to Brazil and the Tropicalia music revival of the early 1960s.

In part, the success of the initial album has prompted a second Red Hot + Rio project, a live concert event slated for December 2008 in New York City's Brooklyn Academy of Music.  Contrasting with the 1996 album, Red Hot + Rio 2: The Next Generation of Samba Soul will contain works from Brazil's samba music heritage.  The concert will benefit AIDS-related projects coordinated through the Brazil Foundation, founded in New York in 2000 to promote social development throughout communities in Brazil.

Track listing
"Use Your Head (Use a Sua Cabeca)" performed by Money Mark – 2:47
"Corcovado" performed by Everything but the Girl – 3:56
"Desafinado (Off Key)" performed by Astrud Gilberto + George Michael – 3:20
"Non-Fiction Burning" performed by PM Dawn with Flora Purim + Airto – 4:31
"The Boy from Ipanema" performed by Crystal Waters – 4:24
(Interlude) – 0:14
"Segurança (Security)" performed by Maxwell – 3:29
"É Preciso Perdoar (You Must Forgive)" performed by Cesária Évora + Caetano Veloso + Ryuichi Sakamoto – 6:01
(Interlude) – 0:33
"Water to Drink (Água de Beber)" performed by Incognito + Omar + Ana Caram – 4:19
"Dancing…" performed by Milton Nascimento – 3:20
"How Insensitive" performed by Antônio Carlos Jobim + Sting – 3:44
"Waters of March (Aguas de Março)" performed by David Byrne + Marisa Monte – 3:15
(Interlude) – 0:25
"One Note Samba / Surfboard" performed by Stereolab + Herbie Mann – 7:18
(Interlude) – 0:21
"Black Orpheus Dub" performed by Mad Professor – 3:59
"Maracatu Atômico" performed by Chico Science + Nação Zumbi + DJ Soul Slinger – 4:27
"Sambadrome" performed by Ivo Meirelles + Funk 'n Lata – 0:58
"Refazenda (Refarm)" performed by Gilberto Gil – 4:00
"Preciso Dizer Que Te Amo" performed by Cazuza + Bebel Gilberto – 4:42

See also
Red Hot Organization

References

External links
Red Hot + Rio Album information from Discogs
Red Hot in Rio Album review from allaboutjazz.com

Red Hot Organization albums
Jazz compilation albums
1996 compilation albums
Bossa nova albums
Downtempo compilation albums
Antilles Records compilation albums
Verve Records compilation albums